Governor Gordon may refer to:

James Wright Gordon (1809–1853), 3rd Governor of Michigan
John Brown Gordon (1832–1904), 53rd Governor of Georgia
 Mark Gordon (politician) (born 1957), 33rd Governor of Wyoming 
Patrick Gordon (governor) (died 1736), Acting Governor of the Province of Pennsylvania
Walter A. Gordon (1894–1976), 18th Governor of the United States Virgin Islands